Lerch Tavern is a historic inn and tavern building located at Wernersville, Berks County, Pennsylvania. It was built in 1797, and is a two-story, rectangular limestone building.  It is five bays by two bays, and measures 32 feet by 42 feet.  The raised mansard roof was added about 1870 and replaced an earlier gable roof.  The tavern operated into the 1850s, after which it was occupied as a private residence.  It remained in the Lerch family from its construction into the 1950s.

It was added to the National Register of Historic Places in 1979.

References

Hotel buildings on the National Register of Historic Places in Pennsylvania
Commercial buildings completed in 1870
Buildings and structures in Berks County, Pennsylvania
National Register of Historic Places in Berks County, Pennsylvania